Éléonore-Aglaé-Marie Despierres (16 January 1843 – 9 November 1895), was a French historian.

Éléonore Bonnaire was born on 16 January 1843 at Alençon. A correspondent of the French Ministry of Education, she published studies on topics related to her hometown, such as the Alençon lace, the Notre-Dame d'Alençon basilica, the history of printing, theater and sculptors of Alençon.

The wife of Lucien, Vincent, Gerasime Despierres, Bonnaire died on 9 November 1895 at Pacé, Orne. A street of her native town of Alençon was named after her in 2007.

Notes

Publications
 Alençon lace. trad. Roberta Morgan, Aberdeen, Aberdeen University Press (1987), 207 p. : ill. ; 23 cm. .
  Commande au XVIIe siècle d’un tableau représentant une descente de croix. Paris, E. Plon, Nourrit (1894).
  Construction du Pont-Royal de Paris (1685-1688), Nogent-le-Rotrou, Impr. de G. Daupeley-Gouverneur (1895).
  Documents concernant l’église Notre-Dame d’Alençon. Paris, E. Plon et Nourrit (1890).
  Établissement d’imprimeries à Alençon de 1529 à 1575. Paris, E. Leroux (1894).
  Histoire du point d’Alençon. Alençon (1882 ; rééd. Paris, Librairie Renouard, H. Laurens ; rééd. Amiens, Res universis, 1989, VIII-276 p.-VIII f. de pl. : ill., couv. ill. ; 21 cm access online. .
  Le Château de Carrouges (Orne), sa chapelle, ses sculptures au XVIIe. Paris, Impr. de E. Plon, Nourrit et Cie (1893).
  Le Théâtre et les comédiens à Alençon au seizième et au dix-septième siècle. Paris, E. Plon, Nourrit (1892).
  Les Gabriel recherches sur les origines provinciales de ces architectes. Paris, E. Plon, Nourrit et Cie (1895).
  Les Orgues de Notre-Dame d’Alençon. Argentan, Impr. du  Journal de l'Orne (1888).
  Menuisiers-imagiers ou sculpteurs des seizième et dix-septième siècles à Alençon. Paris, E. Plon, Nourrit (1892).
  Origine du point d’Alençon. Alençon, impr. de A. Lepage (1882 ; 1883).
  Portail et vitraux de l’église Notre-Dame d’Alençon : nomenclature des peintres, peintres-vitriers, aux quinzième et seizième siècles à Alençon''. Paris, E. Plon, Nourrit (1891).

1843 births
1917 deaths
19th-century French historians
Writers from Alençon